Dicepolia vaga is a moth in the family Crambidae. It was described by James E. Hayden in 2009. It is found in the Andes in Ecuador, as well as in Panama and montane Jamaica.

The length of the forewings is 4.2–5.2 mm. The forewings are uniform brownish orange with transverse lines, marked by darker orange and black scales. The hindwings are bronzy, the terminal area rose orange from the dark postmedial line to the edge. Adults have been recorded on wing from January to May and in June in Ecuador, from December to January and in April in Panama and in April in Jamaica.

Etymology
The species name refers to the disjunct distribution and is derived from Latin vagus (meaning wandering).

References

Moths described in 2009
Odontiinae